Springvale Aerodrome  is located  west of Springvale, Ontario, Canada.

References

Registered aerodromes in Ontario
Buildings and structures in Haldimand County